Asam is a surname. Notable people with the surname include:

 Cosmas Damian Asam (1686–1739), German Baroque painter and architect, one of the Asam brothers
 Egid Quirin Asam (1692–1750), German Baroque plasterer and sculptor, one of the Asam brothers
 Liesbeth Mau Asam (born 1982), Dutch short-track speed skater
 Werner Asam (born 1944), German actor and director